The Forbes list of Australia's 50 richest people is the annual survey of the fifty wealthiest people resident in Australia, published by Forbes Asia in January 2018. 

The net worth of the wealthiest individual, Gina Rinehart, was estimated to be 17.40 billion.

List of individuals

See also
 Financial Review Rich List
 Forbes list of Australia's 50 richest people

References

2018 in Australia
2018